Roland Lynch (20 March 1893 – 21 February 1971) was an Australian rules footballer who played with Fitzroy in the Victorian Football League (VFL).

Notes

External links 

1893 births
1971 deaths
Australian rules footballers from Melbourne
Fitzroy Football Club players
People from Murrumbeena, Victoria